Lars Jörgen Lantz (born 23 December 1943, in Stockholm, Sweden) is a Swedish actor, known for his appearances in children's TV program, among them Ville, Valle och Viktor (as Ville) and Björnes magasin (1987–2001, as Björne).

Selected filmography
1965 - Flygplan saknas
1967 - Hagbard and Signe
1970 & 1972 - Ville, Valle och Viktor (TV) (also screenwriter)
1974 - Huset Silfvercronas gåta (TV)
1991 - Charlie Strap and Froggy Ball Flying High
1999 - En liten julsaga

References

External links

1943 births
Living people
Male actors from Stockholm